The Framework Law of Mother Earth and Integral Development for Living Well is a Bolivian law (Law 300 of the Plurinational State) enacted on October 15, 2012. It is the successor to the Law of the Rights of Mother Earth and was initially designed as full version of that law. According to Derrick Hindery, "the law clearly reflects both the more environmentally progressive ideals pushed by the Unity Pact and the extractivist agenda of the Morales administration."

The law authorizes the creation of new institutions: 
 A Mother Earth Ombudsman's Office parallel to the human rights-oriented Defensoría del Pueblo. , this office has not been created.
 The Plurinational Mother Earth Authority (APMT), which oversees climate change policies, was created by Supreme Decree 1696 in 2013.

References

External links
 Full text in Spanish from lexivox.org

2012 in Bolivia
2012 in the environment
Environmental law in Bolivia
Environmental personhood